Philip LaZebnik (born 8 February 1953 in Ann Arbor, Michigan) is an American screenwriter and producer. LaZebnik has written screenplays for films including Pocahontas, Mulan, The Prince of Egypt, The Road to El Dorado, The Lost Treasure of the Knights Templar, Asterix and the Vikings, The Three Investigators and the Secret of Skeleton Island, The Lost Treasure of the Knights Templar II, The Lost Treasure of the Knights Templar III: The Mystery of the Snake Crown, The Three Investigators and the Secret of Terror Castle, Emma and Santa Claus and The Ark and the Aardvark.  He wrote the book for the musical "Fairy Tale" about Hans Christian Andersen with songs by Stephen Schwartz, and wrote the book and lyrics for "Oktoberfest: the Musical" with music by Harold Faltermeyer. In collaboration with Mads Æbeløe Nielsen he wrote the book for the theatrical musical version of Djævelens lærling (or The Devil's Apprentice), a best-selling Danish fantasy novel of the same name by Kenneth B. Andersen, with songs and music by Madeline Myers. 

He wrote the book for DreamWorks' theatrical musical version of The Prince of Egypt with songs by Stephen Schwartz which opened October 14, 2017 at TheatreWorks in Palo Alto, California and then April 6, 2018 at Fredericia Theatre in Denmark. The Prince of Egypt premiered at the Dominion Theatre in London's West End February 25, 2020.

LaZebnik also wrote episodes for Wings, Star Trek: The Next Generation, Star Trek: Deep Space Nine, The Torkelsons and Almost Home.

LaZebnik has served on the board of directors of the Writers Guild of America West (2001–02) and the Writers Branch Executive Committee of the Academy of Motion Picture Arts and Sciences (2001–03). The screenplay for Mulan won the 1998 Annie Award for best animation screenplay.

He grew up in Columbia, Missouri, attended Hickman High School, and graduated from Harvard College in 1976, with a B.A. in Classics. His brothers are Ken LaZebnik and Rob LaZebnik.

References

External links

1953 births
People from Columbia, Missouri
Hickman High School alumni
Harvard College alumni
American male screenwriters
Living people
Annie Award winners
American film producers
Animation screenwriters
Walt Disney Animation Studios people